Maria Teresa (born María Teresa Mestre y Batista; 22 March 1956) is the Grand Duchess of Luxembourg as the wife of Grand Duke Henri, who acceded to the throne in 2000.

Early life and education
Maria Teresa was born on 22 March 1956 in Marianao, Havana, Cuba, to José Antonio Mestre y Álvarez (1926–1993) and wife  María Teresa Batista y Falla de Mestre (1928–1988), both from bourgeois families of Spanish descent.

In October 1959, at the time of the Cuban Revolution, Maria Teresa Mestre’s parents left Cuba with their children, because the new government headed by Fidel Castro confiscated their properties. The family settled in New York City,  where as a young girl she was a pupil at Marymount School. From 1961 she carried on her studies at the Lycée Français de New York. In her childhood, Maria Teresa Mestre took ballet and singing courses. She practices skiing, ice-skating and water sports. She later lived in Santander, Spain, and in Geneva, Switzerland, where she became a Swiss citizen.

In 1980, Maria Teresa graduated from the Graduate Institute of International and Development Studies in Geneva with a degree in political sciences. While studying there, she met her future husband Henri of Luxembourg.

Social and humanitarian interests
Soon after her marriage, Maria Teresa and the then Hereditary Grand Duke Henri established The Prince Henri and Princess Maria Teresa Foundation to help those with special needs integrate fully into society. In 2001, she and her husband created The Grand Duke and Grand Duchess Foundation, launched upon the accession of the couple as the new Grand Duke and Duchess of Luxembourg. In 2004, the Grand Duke Henri and the Grand Duchess Maria Teresa Foundation was created after the merging of the two previous foundations.

In 1997, Maria Teresa was made a special ambassador for UNESCO, working to expand education for young girls and women and help to fight poverty.

Since 2005, Maria Teresa has been the chairwoman of the international jury of the European Microfinance Award, which annually awards holders of microfinance and inclusive finance initiatives in developing countries. Also, since 2006, Maria Teresa has been honorary president of the LuxFLAG (Luxembourg Fund Labeling Agency), the first agency to label responsible microfinance investment funds around the world.

On 19 April 2007, the Grand Duchess was appointed UNICEF Eminent Advocate for Children, in which role she has visited Brazil (2007), China (2008), and Burundi (2009).

She is a member of the Honorary Board of the International Paralympic Committee and a patron of the Ligue Luxembourgeoise de Prévention et d’Action medico-sociales and SOS Villages d’Enfants Monde. The Grand Duchess and her husband Grand Duke Henri are the members of the Mentor Foundation (London), created under the patronage of the World Health Organization. She is also the president of the Luxembourg Red Cross and the Cancer Foundation. In 2016, she organized the first international forum on learning disabilities in Luxembourg.

The Grand Duchess supports the UNESCO “Breaking the Poverty Cycle of Women” project in Bangladesh, India, Nepal and Pakistan. The purpose of this project is to improve the living conditions of girls, women and their families. As honorary president of her own foundation, Grand Duchess Maria Teresa set up a project called Projet de la Main Tendue after visiting the Bujumbura prison in 2009 in Burundi. The purpose of this project is to liberate minor people from prison and to give them new opportunities for their future.

In October 2016, Maria Teresa accepted an invitation to join the eminent international Council of Patrons of the Asian University for Women (AUW) in Chittagong, Bangladesh. The university, which is the product of east-west foundational partnerships (Bill and Melinda Gates Foundation, Open Society Foundation, IKEA Foundation, etc.) and regional cooperation, serves extraordinarily talented women from 15 countries across Asia and the Middle East.

In 2019, Maria Teresa presented her initiative "Stand Speak Rise Up!" to end sexual violence in fragile environments, launched in cooperation with the Women’s Forum and with the support of the Luxembourg government. The conference is in partnership with the Dr. Denis Mukwege Foundation and We Are Not Weapons of War.

In 2020 the Prime Minister of Luxembourg commissioned a report into the Cour le Grand Ducal following concerns over its working. The report found that up to 1/3 of employees had left since 2015 and that "The most important decisions in the field of personnel management, whether at the level of recruitment, assignment to the various departments or even at the dismissal level are taken by HRH the Grand Duchess.” Several newspaper reports at the time highlighted a 'culture of fear' around the Grand Duchess and "that no-one bar the Prime Minister dared confront her". The report also raised concerns about the use of public funds to pay for the Grand Duchess' personal website and that this had been prioritised over the Cour's own official website. There were also allegations that staff at the Court has been subject to physical abuse and these reports were investigated by the Luxembourg judicial police.
In February 2023 it was reported by several Luxembourg based media that the Grand Duchess had once again been accused of treating staff poorly during an outfit fitting in October 22. The incident even involved the Prime Minister of Luxembourg having to speak to the Grand Duke and Grand Duchess about the treatment of the staff and commissioning a report into it.

Family

Maria Teresa married Prince Henri of Luxembourg in a civil ceremony on 4 February 1981 and a religious ceremony on 14 February 1981, since Valentine's Day was their favourite holiday. The consent of the Grand Duke had been previously given on 7 November 1980. She received a bouquet of red roses and a sugarcane as a wedding gift from Cuban leader Fidel Castro. The couple has five children: Guillaume, Hereditary Grand Duke of Luxembourg, Prince Félix of Luxembourg, Prince Louis of Luxembourg, Princess Alexandra of Luxembourg, and Prince Sébastien of Luxembourg, They were born at Maternity Hospital in Luxembourg City.

Honours

National 
 :
 Knight of the Order of the Gold Lion of the House of Nassau
 Knight Grand Cross of the Order of Adolphe of Nassau

Foreign 
 : Grand Cross of the Order of Honour for Services to the Republic of Austria, 1st Class
 : Dame Grand Cross of the Order of Leopold I
 : Grand Cross of the Order of the Southern Cross
 : Knight of the Order of the Elephant
 : Grand Cross of the Order of the White Rose of Finland
 : Grand Cross of the Order of National Merit
 : Grand Cross of the Order of Beneficence
 : Grand Cross of the Order of Merit of the Italian Republic
 : Dame Grand Cordon (Paulownia) of the Order of the Precious Crown
 : Grand Cross of the Order of the Three Stars
 :
 Dame Grand Cross of the Order of the Lion of the Netherlands
 Dame Grand Cross of the Order of the Crown
 : Dame Grand Cross of the Order of Saint Olav
 Portugal-
  Portuguese Royal Family:
 Dame Grand Cross of the Royal Order of Saint Isabel
 :
 Grand Cross of the Order of Christ
 Grand Cross of the Order of Saint James of the Sword
 Grand Cross of the Order of Infante Henry
 Grand Cross of the Order of Camões
 : Grand Cross of the Order of the Star of Romania
 : Dame Grand Cross of the Order of Charles III
 :
 Member Grand Cross of the Royal Order of the Seraphim
 Member Grand Cross of the Royal Order of the Polar Star
 Recipient of the 50th Birthday Badge Medal of King Carl XVI Gustaf

Footnotes

External links

Official website
The Mentor Foundation charity website

1956 births
Living people
People from Havana
Grand Ducal Consorts of Luxembourg
University of Geneva alumni
Graduate Institute of International and Development Studies alumni
20th-century Spanish nobility
Cuban nobility
Lycée Français de New York alumni

Grand Crosses of the Order of Beneficence (Greece)
Grand Crosses of the Order of Christ (Portugal)
Grand Crosses of the Order of Saint James of the Sword
Grand Crosses of the Order of the Star of Romania
Knights Grand Cross of the Order of Merit of the Italian Republic
Recipients of the Grand Star of the Decoration for Services to the Republic of Austria
Dames of the Order of Saint Isabel
Grand Crosses of the Order of Prince Henry
Cuban people of Spanish descent
Luxembourgian people of Spanish descent
UNESCO Goodwill Ambassadors
Princesses by marriage